Army Golf Club is a golf club in Dhaka Cantonment, Bangladesh operated by Bangladesh Army. The present president of the club Maj Gen Md Moshfequr Rahman, SGP, SUP, ndc, psc

History

Army Golf Club was founded on 28 May 2001. It was opened by the first President of the Club and then Chief of Army Staff Lt General M Harun-Ar-Rashid. Bangladesh Golf Academy, first golf academy of Bangladesh was opened on 9 June 2010. The club is affiliated with Kurmitola Golf Club. It has a 9-hole course and over 40 acre in size. Golf garden restaurant is located in the club.

References

External links
 official website

Golf clubs and courses in Bangladesh
2001 establishments in Bangladesh
Clubs and societies in Bangladesh
Organisations based in Dhaka
Bangladesh Army